Grevillea didymobotrya is a species of flowering plant in the family Proteaceae and is endemic to the south-west of Western Australia. It is an erect shrub with simple leaves, the size and shape depending on subspecies, and cylindrical groups of yellow or cream-coloured flowers.

Description

Taxonomy
Grevillea didymobotrya by Carl Meissner in Prodromus Systematis Naturalis Regni Vegetabilis in 1856, from material collected by James Drummond in the Swan River Colony. The specific epithet (didymobotrya) is derived from Ancient Greek words meaning "paired" and "bunch of grapes", referring to the racemes.

In 1986, Donald McGillivray described two subspecies in his book, New Names in Grevillea (Proteaceae) and the names are accepted by the Australian Plant Census:

Distribution and habitat
This species of grevillea grows in heath, shrubland or mallee on sandplains and is widespread from near Shark Bay to Cundeelee Balladonia and Ravensthorpe. Subspecies involuta has a more restricted distribution between Geraldton and Mullewa.

Conservation status
Both subspecies of G. didymobotrya are listed as "not threatened" by the Government of Western Australia Department of Biodiversity, Conservation and Attractions.

References

didymobotrya
Endemic flora of Western Australia
Eudicots of Western Australia
Proteales of Australia
Taxa named by Carl Meissner
Plants described in 1856